Piemonte is the Italian name for Piedmont, a region of northern Italy.

Piemonte may also refer to:

Piemonte (wine)
Piemonte F.C.
5162 Piemonte, a main-belt asteroid
29th Infantry Division "Piemonte", an infantry division of Italy of the Second World War

People with the surname
Gabriel Piemonte (1909-1991), American attorney and politician
Martina Piemonte, Italian footballer
Patrick Piemonte, American inventor and computer scientist

See also 
 Piemonte-Sardinia, the Kingdom of Sardinia
 Piemontesi, a surname
 Piemont (disambiguation)
 Piedmont (disambiguation)
 Piamonte  (disambiguation)